The Wagner Seahawks football program is the intercollegiate American football team for Wagner College located in the U.S. state of New York. The team competes in the NCAA Division I Football Championship Subdivision (FCS) and are members of the Northeast Conference. Wagner's first football team was fielded in 1927. The team plays its home games at the 3,300 seat Wagner College Stadium in Staten Island, New York. The Seahawks are coached by Tom Masella.

History

Classifications
1956–1972: NCAA College Division
1973–1992: NCAA Division III
1993–present: NCAA Division I–AA/FCS

Conference memberships
1927: Independent
1928–1929: Metropolitan Collegiate Conference
1930–1957: Independent
1958–1974: Middle Atlantic States Collegiate Athletic Corporation
1972–1977: Metropolitan Intercollegiate Conference
1978–1991: Division III Independent
1992: Liberty Football Conference
1993–1995: NCAA Division I–AA Independent
1996–present: Northeast Conference

Head coaching history

Championships

National championships
Wagner has made one appearance in the NCAA Division III National Championship Game, defeating Dayton 19–3 in the 1987 championship game.

ECAC championships
Under head coach Walt Hameline, Wagner won its first championship in school history by dominating St. John's 48–7 in November 1983, avenging one of its only two losses that season. The Seahawks scored the first four times they had the ball in the opening half. The senior class ended their careers as one of the winningest in Wagner history with a four-year record of 34–6–2. This class also played part in Wagner's first-ever NCAA appearance in 1980, and helped establish the foundation to Wagner's rise as a national power in Division III, culminating in a national championship in 1987, and eventual move to NCAA I-AA (now FCS) status.

Conference championships
 2012 – Northeast Conference co-champion
 2014 – Northeast Conference co-champion

Playoffs

NCAA Division I-AA/FCS
The Seahawks have appeared in the FCS playoffs one time with an overall record of 1–1.

NCAA Division III
The Seahawks have appeared in the Division III playoffs four times with an overall record of 4–3. They were Division III National Champions in 1987.

Future non-conference opponents 
Future non-conference opponents announced as of January 23, 2023.

References

External links
 

 
American football teams established in 1927
1927 establishments in New York City